Albuquerque Asylum was an American soccer team based in Albuquerque, New Mexico, United States. Founded in 2004, the team was a member of the National Premier Soccer League (NPSL), a national amateur league at the fourth tier of the American Soccer Pyramid. The team is currently on hiatus from the NPSL due to a lack of teams in the Southwest Division.

The team plays its home games at the stadium on the campus of Menaul School. The team's colors are gold and navy blue and white.

The team has a sister organization, Albuquerque Lady Asylum, which plays in the Women's Premier Soccer League.

Year-by-year

Honors
 NPSL Southwest Division Champions 2006

Coaches
  Dennis Genas (2006–2008)

Stadia
 Lovelace Soccer Complex; Santa Ana Pueblo, New Mexico (2004–2005)
 Stadium at Menaul School; Albuquerque, New Mexico (2006–present)

Indoor team
The Albuquerque Asylum indoor team is a member of the Premier Arena Soccer League (PASL), the development league for the Professional Arena Soccer League (PASL-Pro), and plays in the Rocky Mountain Conference against teams from Rio Rancho, Colorado Springs, Windsor, Golden, and Fort Collins. They play their home matches at the Blades Multi Plex in the city of Rio Rancho, New Mexico, and also play in blue and white.

PASL Roster

Year-by-year

Notable players

Kyle Altman (born 1986)

References

 
National Premier Soccer League teams
Soccer clubs in New Mexico
Sports in Albuquerque, New Mexico
2004 establishments in Arizona
Association football clubs established in 2004